Protostrongylus is a genus of nematodes belonging to the family Protostrongylidae.

The species of this genus are found in Europe and Northern America.

Species:

Protostrongylus brevispiculatum 
Protostrongylus commutatus 
Protostrongylus cuniculorum 
Protostrongylus davtiani 
Protostrongylus hobmaieri 
Protostrongylus kamenskyi 
Protostrongylus muraschkinzewi 
Protostrongylus oryctolagi 
Protostrongylus pulmonalis 
Protostrongylus raillieti 
Protostrongylus rufescens 
Protostrongylus rupicaprae 
Protostrongylus tauricus

References

Nematodes